Emmanuel-Étienne Duvillard (1775–1832) was a Swiss economist.

References

1775 births
1832 deaths
Economists from the Republic of Geneva
Swiss economists